Clarence Henry Fisher (August 27, 1898 – November 2, 1965) was a pitcher in Major League Baseball. He played for the Washington Senators.

References

External links

1898 births
1965 deaths
Major League Baseball pitchers
Washington Senators (1901–1960) players
Baseball players from West Virginia
People from Letart, West Virginia
Rio Grande RedStorm baseball players